LACITO (Langues et Civilisations à Tradition Orale) is a multidisciplinary research organisation, principally devoted to the study of cultures and languages of oral tradition.

LACITO is a branch of the Centre National de la Recherche Scientifique (CNRS), the principal network of researchers in France. It is thus occasionally referred to as LACITO–CNRS or CNRS–LACITO.

Scientific activities
Created in 1976 by André-Georges Haudricourt, LACITO is specialized in the description, documentation and analysis of under-documented languages of the world. The members of LACITO are linguists and linguistic anthropologists.

The main perspective adopted by LACITO’s researchers is that of language typology, as linguistic structures are compared in search of universals, yet with special attention to their diversity. Besides language documentation and grammatical description, research at LACITO also includes historical linguistics, lexicography, psycholinguistics, sociolinguistics, linguistic anthropology, verbal art and cultural diversity.

An important contribution of LACITO is the Pangloss Collection, for the preservation of valuable audio archives in the world's endangered languages.

Language expertise

Linguistic research at LACITO involves fieldwork in various language families, including:

Domains of research

Notes

External links
Homepage of LACITO.
Map of languages studied at LACITO
Who’s who at LACITO
Les Carnets du LACITO (LACITO's blog)
Homepage of the Pangloss Collection

Linguistics organizations
French National Centre for Scientific Research